Ó Conghaile is an Irish name (from Ó Conghalaigh). Notable people with the name include:

 Micheál Ó Conghaile (fl. 1878–1892), Irish scribe
 Micheál Ó Conghaile (writer) (born 1962)
 Séamas Ó Conghaile

See also
 Connolly (disambiguation)
 Connelly (disambiguation)